Oleksandr Hrytsay (born 30 September 1977) is a Ukrainian retired footballer who played as central defender for Zorya Luhansk in the Ukrainian Premier League.

Playing career

Cheksyl Chernihiv
Hrytsay started his career at FC Cheksyl Chernihiv, where he played 25 matches.

Dnipro Cherkasy
He moved to FC Dnipro Cherkasy from 1997 to 1999, scoring three goals in 70 appearances for the club.

Dnipro Dnipropetrovsk
In 1999, he moved to Dnipro Dnipropetrovsk, where is spent the majority of his career, scoring four goals in 194 appearances. He played in the final of the 2003–04 Ukrainian Cup with Dnipro he got in the final of the Ukrainian Cup.

Kryvbas Kryvyi Rih (On Loan)
In 2009 he moved on loan to Kryvbas Kryvyi Rih where he played 10 matches.

Arsenal Kyiv
In 2010 he moved on loan to Arsenal Kyiv, appearing in 27 matches, scoring a goal, and reaching the semi-final of Ukrainian Cup.

Zorya Luhansk
On 9 January 2012 he moved to Zorya Luhansk, where he stayed until 2015. In 2015 Hrytsai retired and joined the coaching staff of the club.

International career
Hrytsay made his debut for the Ukraine national football team on 22 August 2007 in a 2–1 victory over Uzbekistan. On 17 October 2007 he played against Faroe Islands replacing Anatoliy Tymoshchuk at 69 minute. On 21 November 2007, he played titular against France.

Managerial career
From 2015 to 2019 he has been hired as Zorya Luhansk assistant coach. In 2020 he has been appointed as Rukh Lviv as assistant and he left in summer 2021. as he has been appointed as head coach of VPK-Ahro Shevchenkivka in Ukrainian First League. On 18 August 2021 he managed to bring the team into the Second preliminary round, after winning against Real Pharma Odesa in the season 2021–22 in Ukrainian Cup. On 31 August 2021 he managed to get the team into the Round of 32, after winning against Balkany Zorya in Ukrainian Cup in the season 2021–22.

Honours
Dnipro Dnipropetrovsk
 Ukrainian Cup: Runner-Up 2003–04

Gallery

References

External links

Profile from VPK-Ahro Shevchenkivka website

 

1977 births
Living people
Footballers from Chernihiv
Ukrainian footballers
Ukraine international footballers
Ukrainian Premier League players
Ukrainian First League players
Ukrainian Second League players
FC Yunist Chernihiv players
FC Cheksyl Chernihiv players
FC Dnipro Cherkasy players
FC Dnipro players
FC Kryvbas Kryvyi Rih players
FC Arsenal Kyiv players
FC Zorya Luhansk players
Association football midfielders
Association football defenders
Ukrainian football managers
FC VPK-Ahro Shevchenkivka managers
Ukrainian First League managers